Geophilus persephones is a species of soil centipede in the family Geophilidae discovered in 1999. This species is named after Persephone, the queen of the underworld in Greek mythology, and found in caves in the Gouffre de la Pierre Saint-Martin. It has elongated antennae and legs as well as abundant sensory setae, and like other geophilomorhps it lacks sight, has a flattened trunk, and is well adapted to underground life.  This species was the first troglomorphic geophilomorph ever discovered and one of the only two in existence along with Geophilus hadesi. Known from a single male specimen, this species has only 29 pairs of legs, one of only two species in the Geophilidae family to have so few leg pairs.

See also
 Geophilus hadesi

References

persephones
Animals described in 1999
Taxa named by Alessandro Minelli